Maan (lit. Proud) is a Pakistani family drama series that premiered on Hum TV on 19 October 2015, airing a weekly episode on Mondays. Due to drama serial Mann Mayal, Maan is airing on Fridays instead of Mondays from 29 January 2016. It is directed by Amin Iqbal and written by Shehla Shakoor. This drama serial is produced by Abdullah Kadwani and Asad Qureshi of 7th Sky Productions and Meekal Zulfiqar who also served as the head of the project and Hira Anwar of Hum TV.

Meekal Zulfiqar and Kiran Haq star as parents of two girls and the younger girl has a heart problem. They are facing financial problems and don't have enough money to do the surgery of their younger girl, which lead their family to destruction. Maha Warsi portrays a villainous role while Seemi Raheel stars as a mother of Zulfiqar and Saleem Sheikh as his brother.

Premise
'Maan' revolves around the story of a married couple, Imaan (Mikaal Zulfiqar) and Wafa (Kiran Haq). They have two daughters and are living happy lives, but they become difficult when their younger daughter is diagnosed with heart disease and they don't have enough money to pay 6,000,000 rupees for her treatment. In this condition, Imaan is forced to join a job of Maya (Maha Warsi), his first love. Maya asks Imaan for his hand in marriage and he accepts on the condition that she will pay for his younger daughter, Hania's treatment. His life changes as he has two wives and is left in a tiff as he has to care for both. His wife eventually finds out of his betrayal and stops talking to him. He tries his best to explain but she is not ready to listen. Meanwhile, their younger daughter dies in a stress of revising her father who swore he would return home but due to a meeting, he was unable to. During her funeral, Maya and Imaan go to the house to see Hania. Waafa, in a rage of anger yells at them that Hania's death was all caused by Imaan. She explains that her daughter waited and waited but his father didn't come. After getting told to leave by his mum, Imaan and Maya return to the house unhappily. Maya plans to go on holiday to make Imaan happy but he is sad and guilty of the words of Waafa.

Cast
Main 
 Meekal Zulfiqar as Imaan
 Kiran Haq as Wafa 
 Seemi Raheel as Bibi 
 Maha Warsi as Maya 
 Waseem Abbas as Rashid

Recurring 
 Umair Tahir Rana as Arslan
 Naima Khan as Maheen
 Saima Saeed Malik
 Zain Afzal
 Saleem Sheikh as Nadeem
 Rana Aftab
 Imran Ahmad
 Eshal as Monunoo
 Kashaf as Hania

References

External links
 Official Website 
 7th Sky Productions

2015 Pakistani television series debuts
2016 Pakistani television series endings
Hum TV
Hum Network Limited
Hum TV original programming
Television series about dysfunctional families
Television series set in Lahore
Television series set in Punjab, Pakistan
Urdu-language television shows
Pakistani drama television series
Serial drama television series
7th Sky Entertainment